Firebase may refer to:

Military
 Fire support base, a type of artillery base
 Forward operating base, a type of military base
 Base of fire, a type of military force

Computing
 Firebase Inc., a subsidiary of Google
 Firebase application platform, from Firebase Inc.
 Firebase Cloud Messaging (FCM) from Firebase Inc.; formerly Google Cloud Messaging (GCM)

Other uses
 Any basis of combustion, any one of the three legs of the fire triangle
 The point at which a flame emerges in a fire

See also

 
 
 
 
 Fire (disambiguation)
 Base (disambiguation)
 FB (disambiguation)

Disambiguation pages